Connel Ferry railway station is a railway station serving the village of Connel in western Scotland. This station is on the Oban branch of the West Highland Line, originally part of the Callander and Oban Railway, between Oban and Taynuilt, sited  from Callander via Glen Ogle. All services are operated by ScotRail, who also manage the station.

History 

The station was opened in either 1880 or 1903, and in its heyday, when it served a branch to Ballachulish, it had five platforms, a goods yard and a turntable. Later this was reduced to just the single platform, after the branch closed in 1966, as it remains today.

Accidents and incidents 
During the 1968 demolition of Connel Ferry West signal box, contractors burning the wooden remains set fire to the track formation. Despite efforts to put the fire out, it continued to burn for several days, causing the embankment to crumble and smoke to issue from fissures in the trackbed. This resulted in a 5 mph speed restriction being imposed and, at the time, caused concerns that the line may be forced to close.

Facilities 
Facilities at the station are basic, consisting of just a shelter, a bench, bike racks, a help point and a small car park. As there are no facilities to purchase tickets, passengers must buy one in advance, or from the guard on the train.

Passenger volume 

The statistics cover twelve month periods that start in April.

Services

On Sundays, there are three departures each way throughout the year, plus a fourth in the summer months only to Edinburgh Waverley, which only runs from late June–August.

References

Bibliography

External Links 

 Video footage of the station on YouTube

Railway stations in Argyll and Bute
Former Caledonian Railway stations
Railway stations in Great Britain opened in 1880
Railway stations served by ScotRail